Kelly Victoria Gould is an American former child actress. She is known for her role as Shannon Clemens on the Lifetime original comedy series Rita Rocks, and as Lucy on the HBO sitcom Lucky Louie. Gould appeared in many television series along with three feature-length movies: Blades of Glory, The Rebound and 16 Love.

At age 14, Gould took a break from acting to focus on social action. She enrolled in classes at College of the Canyons in Santa Clarita at 15 years old.

Early life
Gould was born in Los Angeles, California, to a Jewish family.

Career
Gould's acting career began at three weeks old in a birthing scene. At six weeks old, she portrayed baby Chastity Bono in a movie about Sonny & Cher. She played the role of four-year-old Lucy, the daughter of Louie and Kim, on the Home Box Office comedy series Lucky Louie. Gould appeared in the CBS television series The Ghost Whisperer in 2007 playing the role of young Melinda in the episode "All Ghosts Lead to Grandview". She also has appeared in feature films, including the 2007 comedy Blades of Glory, and the 2009 film The Rebound in which she co-starred as one of Catherine Zeta-Jones' children.

She co-starred in the role of Shannon Clemens on the Lifetime original series Rita Rocks from 2008 to 2009.<ref>[http://www.mylifetime.com/shows/rita-rocks/cast Lifetime: Cast of Rita Rocks] </ref> Scott D. Pierce of Deseret News said this about Gould's performance on Rita Rocks: "9-year-old Shannon (Kelly Gould) is one of those too-cutesy-to-be-true sitcom kids."

In 2009, Gould appeared in the Lifetime channel television series Drop Dead Diva. She played the role of Rosie, Emma Ross's friend, in several episodes of the Disney Channel comedy series Jessie'' in 2012–2013. When Gould turned fourteen she decided to stop acting, though she indicated that she might pursue acting after college.

Filmography

References

Notes

Citations

External links
 
 

21st-century American actresses
American child actresses
American film actresses
American television actresses
Jewish American actresses
Living people
People from Los Angeles
Year of birth missing (living people)